The Day Utility was an automobile manufactured in Detroit, Michigan by the Day Automobile Company from 1911 to 1914. The Day used a four-cylinder,  engine and shaft drive. Removal of the rear seat and doors allowed the car to be converted from a five-seater touring car to a light truck in one minute. The rear seat could be lifted away by triggering two spring locks. The Day had an advertised price of $950US.

References

 
 Day Utility advertisement in 

Brass Era vehicles
Motor vehicle manufacturers based in Michigan
Defunct motor vehicle manufacturers of the United States
Companies based in Detroit
Vehicle manufacturing companies established in 1911
Defunct manufacturing companies based in Detroit